Treborough is a small village and civil parish  south of Dunster, lying amongst the Brendon Hills within the Exmoor National Park in the Somerset West and Taunton district of Somerset, England.

History

The name Treborough is thought to be derived from the Celtic treberg meaning "hamlet by the waterfall", or wooded place or hill, from the Old English treow for tree.

Treborough was part of the hundred of Carhampton.

Within the village are a pair of lime kilns which date from the early 19th century and are made from flat-bedded local slate.

Governance

The parish council has responsibility for local issues, including setting an annual precept (local rate) to cover the council's operating costs and producing annual accounts for public scrutiny. The parish council evaluates local planning applications and works with the local police, district council officers, and neighbourhood watch groups on matters of crime, security, and traffic. The parish council's role also includes initiating projects for the maintenance and repair of parish facilities, as well as consulting with the district council on the maintenance, repair, and improvement of highways, drainage, footpaths, public transport, and street cleaning. Conservation matters (including trees and listed buildings) and environmental issues are also the responsibility of the council.

The village falls within the non-metropolitan district of Somerset West and Taunton, which was established on 1 April 2019. It was previously in the district of West Somerset, which was formed on 1 April 1974 under the Local Government Act 1972, and part of Williton Rural District before that. The district council is responsible for local planning and building control, local roads, council housing, environmental health, markets and fairs, refuse collection and recycling, cemeteries and crematoria, leisure services, parks, and tourism.

Somerset County Council is responsible for running the largest and most expensive local services such as education, social services, libraries, main roads, public transport, policing and fire services, trading standards, waste disposal and strategic planning.

It is also part of the Bridgwater and West Somerset county constituency represented in the House of Commons of the Parliament of the United Kingdom. It elects one Member of Parliament (MP) by the first past the post system of election.

Geography

Treborough Woods are a  area which contain the site of a slate quarry which was used for 500 years until production finished in World War II.

Religious sites

The Church of St Peter dates from the 14th century and has been designated by English Heritage as a Grade II* listed building.

References

External links

Exmoor National Park information on Treborough

Civil parishes in Somerset
Villages in West Somerset
Lime kilns in the United Kingdom